Creswick railway station is located on the Mildura line in Victoria, Australia. It serves the town of Creswick, and the original station opened on 7 July 1874.

History
The station closed on 12 September 1993, after The Vinelander service to Mildura was withdrawn and replaced by road coaches. 
A new platform, inaugurated on 25 July 2010, was constructed to cater for the restoration of passenger services from Ballarat to Maryborough.

When the return of passenger services was announced, the State Government said that the cost of repairing the station building and upgrading the old platform for wheelchair access was too high, so the new platform was provided. In 2010, local residents proposed that the disused station building be developed into a community hub, with the support of the Hepburn Shire Council and VicTrack.

The new platform is located on the eastern side of the line, with a steel shelter provided for waiting passengers. The former station building, platform and signal box are on the western side of the line, with a pedestrian subway passing underneath the tracks at the southern (up) end. The original station building is listed on the Victorian Heritage Register. A goods shed is also located on the site, with no tracks connected.

The junction for a branch line to Daylesford was approximately 1.6 kilometres north of Creswick, at the former North Creswick station. That branch was constructed in the 1880s and operated until 1952, when it was cut back to Newlyn. It was further truncated to Allendale in 1976, and closed completely in 1985.

In 1988, Creswick was disestablished as an electric staff station, with all signals, points and interlocking, and the signal box, abolished.

Platforms and services
Creswick has one platform. It is served by V/Line Maryborough line trains.

Platform 1:
 services to Maryborough and Ballarat

Transport Links
CDC Ballarat operates one bus route via Creswick station, under contract to Public Transport Victoria:
: Ballarat station – Creswick

V/Line operates road coach services via Creswick station, from Ballarat to Donald.

References

External links
Rail Geelong gallery
Victorian Railway Stations gallery
Melway map at street-directory.com.au

Railway stations in Australia opened in 1874
Regional railway stations in Victoria (Australia)
Victorian Heritage Register
Listed railway stations in Australia